Hessy or Hessie is a given name or nickname. It is the name of:

Hessie (1936–2017), Cuban-French textile artist
Hessie Donahue (1874–1961), American matron and stunt boxer
Hessy Helfman (1855–1882), Russian revolutionary and assassin
Paul Hester (1959–2005), also known as Hessie, Australian musician and television personality
Esther Frances How (1848–1915), also known as Hessie How, Canadian schoolteacher
Hessy Doris Lloyd (1891–1968), English-American actress
Hessy Levinsons Taft (born 1934), Jewish child model for Nazi propaganda
Qatar diplomatic crisis (2017-2021)

See also
Ezaart, a township in Belgium that includes the former town of Hessie
Hester, a related name and nickname